The 2013 All-Ireland Senior Camogie Championship Final was the eighty-second All-Ireland Final and the deciding match of the 2013 All-Ireland Senior Camogie Championship, an inter-county camogie tournament for the top teams in Ireland.

Galway defeated Kilkenny.

References

Camogie
All-Ireland Senior Camogie Championship Finals
All-Ireland Senior Camogie Championship Final
All-Ireland Senior Camogie Championship Final, 2013